Mesorhopalosoma is an extinct genus of wasps in family Rhopalosomatidae.

Taxonomy
The genus contains the following species:
Mesorhopalosoma cearae Darling, 1990

References

Hymenoptera genera
Rhopalosomatidae

Prehistoric insect genera